Gilmore College is an independent public co-educational high day school, located in Orelia, an outer south-western suburb of   in Western Australia, Sited approximately  from the Perth CBD, the school is located on Dargin Place. Formerly known as Kwinana Senior High School (1959 to 2007), and originally was called Medina Junior High School (1956 to 1958), the name Gilmore College was adopted in 2006.

The school was established in 1956 and caters for students from Year 7 to Year 12. Years 7 to 9 comprise the College's middle school, and Years 10 to 12 comprise the College's senior school.

The number of student enrolments have been erratic over the last five years. The school enrolled 780 students in 2007, then 1,204 in 2008, to 1,075 in 2009, then fell to 986 in 2010 and to 957 in 2011. The fall in student numbers from 2010 is a result of the enrolment age changing for students entering high school in Western Australia. Also the fall in student numbers was due to the Peter Carnley Anglican Community School opening nearby in 2007.

History

The current name Gilmore College, as well as Gilmore Avenue (landmarks in Kwinana) are named in honour of the ship Gilmore or Gillmore 1824 ship which was built in Calcutta, British India in 1824 arrived in a voyage to deliver settlers to the Swan River Colony in 1829–1830. Its fate was that it got shipwrecked on Hard Lewis on 12 April 1866.

In 2003, the Minister of Education, Alan Carpenter, announced a 26 million plan to improve educational opportunities for Kwinana youth.

The school was renamed from Kwinana Senior High School to Gilmore College in 2006 following a poll in the local community in 2005. The school's name is taken from the road the school was once located on, Gilmore Avenue. This in turn was taken from the Gilmore, the boat that the early settlers arrived in the area on in 1829.

The middle school was completed by the end of 2007; and the senior school was completed later in 2008.

A fire began in the school under suspicious circumstances in February 2008 causing extensive damage to the school, estimated at 500,000. Three classrooms and part of a hallway were engulfed and smoke damage occurred in other areas.

The school ranked at the top of the state for school suspensions given to students in 2010 at a top of two per day. The number of suspensions dropped after the arrival of Carolyn Cook from Hedland Senior High School in 2011 to 605 then to 208 in 2012.

The school, situated in the Labor heartland seat of Brand hosted a community forum run by the then Prime Minister Julia Gillard in 2012. Other Labor ministers such as local MHR Gary Gray and Chris Evans also attended the event.

Mobile phones and iPods were banned from the school, and Facebook and YouTube were banned from school computers in 2013 to combat bullying at the school. As a result, student suspensions reduced significantly.

In August 2015, there was a gun scare by a student at Gilmore College, Nine News reported.

Principals

The following individuals have served as principal of Gilmore College, or its precedent organisations:

School executive

The current school principal is Rohan Smith since 2015. The three current associate principals are: Dean Gurr, George Sekulla, and Mario Tufilli. The business manager is Tracy Hughes.

Campus

It is near the corner of Gilmore Avenue and Sulphur Road.

It is divided into three parts: Physical Education, Middle School, and Senior School.

There are a whole range of facilities including, a Performing Arts Centre, a Visual Arts Centre, a Design and Technology Centre, Science Laboratories, and Computer Laboratories. All students have online access via classroom computers to the School Library along with the internet. The facilities support a balanced learning experience.

There is a large gymnasium in the centre for indoor sport activities such as badminton, basketball, and volleyball; as well as large ovals, basketball courts, and cricket nets in the Sports Program. Nearby the school is the Kwinana Recquatic centre where people do swimming or fitness.

There is a cafe in the centre of the campus opening Monday to Friday, on school days. A variety of healthy, yummy, and other foods are sold in break times.

The library is a student community part of the campus. Many types of books are found here. It is important for staff in a professional environment, as it is opened Monday to Friday, daily.

The health centre in the Administration building is where the school nurses perform in emergency and accident managements, and health communications for the school. The nurses cooperate with the students parents/guardians on their health status if any change has been made.

Administration at Gilmore College has a school uniform shop as all students should wear the school uniform and the sport uniform, and it can also loan uniforms if needed via Student Services.

Academic programs 

In Gilmore College, there is an academic extension program for each year level for gifted students and for those willing to learn more. A large number of students do Vocational Education and Training (VET) courses as a pathway after high school. The curriculum organises seven learning areas covering English, Mathematics, Science, Humanities and Social Sciences, The Arts, Technology and Enterprise, and Health and Physical Education.

College emblem

The key elements are the star, and the figure striving upward. The points of the star each represent the Department of Education and Training; Challenger TAFE; Murdoch University; Kwinana Industries Council (KIC); and the City of Kwinana. The blue shade is the school colours, and the gold shade means strength, courage, and victory.

House system

In Gilmore College, sport events are divided into four equal houses: Amity (red), Cygnet (gold), Scindian (green), Challenger (blue). The houses compete in sporting carnivals and athletics throughout the year.

WA Gilmore Clontarf Academy

Established in 2008 out of Gilmore College in Medina, the academy serves Years 7–12. The academy has great importance on outcomes such as  employment, well-being, and sport.

Gilmore College is one of the locations of the Clontarf Foundation, a not for profit organisation for young Aboriginal and Torres Strait Islander men.

The academy staff presently includes, operations officers: Ash Collard, and Jarrod Chipperfield; and director, Stephen Davies.

Notable alumni 
 Aaron Pajichmurdered in June 2016

See also

List of schools in the Perth metropolitan area

References

External links

  Gilmore College
 Kwinana Industries Council
 Kwinana TAFE 
 Clontarf Foundation 

Educational institutions established in 1956
Public high schools in Perth, Western Australia
City of Kwinana
1956 establishments in Australia